The 1924 United States presidential election in Maryland took place on November 4, 1924. All contemporary 48 states were part of the 1924 United States presidential election. State voters chose 8 electors to the Electoral College, which selected the president and vice president. 

Maryland was won by the Republican nominee, incumbent President Calvin Coolidge of Massachusetts, over the Democratic nominee, Ambassador John W. Davis of West Virginia. Coolidge ran with former Budget Director Charles G. Dawes of Illinois, while Davis ran with Governor Charles W. Bryan of Nebraska. Also in the running that year was the Progressive Party nominee, Senator Robert M. La Follette of Wisconsin and his running mate Senator Burton K. Wheeler of Montana.

Results

Results by county

Counties that flipped from Republican to Democratic
Anne Arundel
Baltimore (County)
Harford
Howard
St. Mary's

Counties that flipped from Democratic to Republican
Cecil

See also
 United States presidential elections in Maryland
 1924 United States presidential election
 1924 United States elections

Notes

References 

Maryland
1924
Presidential